Palirisa taipeishanis is a moth in the family Eupterotidae. It was described by Rudolf Mell in 1937. It is found in Shaanxi, China.

References

Moths described in 1937
Eupterotinae